The 2010–11 UCI Asia Tour was the 7th season of the UCI Asia Tour. The season began on 10 October 2010 with the Kumamoto International Road Race and ended on 30 September 2011 with the Golan II.

The points leader, based on the cumulative results of previous races, wears the UCI Asia Tour cycling jersey. Mehdi Sohrabi from Iran was the defending champion of the 2009–10 UCI Asia Tour and was crowned as the 2010–11 UCI Asia Tour champion.

Throughout the season, points are awarded to the top finishers of stages within stage races and the final general classification standings of each of the stages races and one-day events. The quality and complexity of a race also determines how many points are awarded to the top finishers, the higher the UCI rating of a race, the more points are awarded.

The UCI ratings from highest to lowest are as follows:
 Multi-day events: 2.HC, 2.1 and 2.2
 One-day events: 1.HC, 1.1 and 1.2

Events

2010

2011

Final standings

Individual classification

Team classification

Nation classification

Nation under-23 classification

External links
 

UCI Asia Tour
2011 in road cycling
2010 in road cycling
UCI
UCI